The Europe/Africa Zone was one of three zones of regional competition in the 2000 Fed Cup.

Group I
Venue: La Manga Club, Murcia, Spain (outdoor clay)
Date: 15–21 May

The eighteen teams were divided into four pools, two of which had four and two of which had five teams. The top team of each pool played-off in a two-round knockout stage to decide which nation progresses to the World Group Play-offs next year. The four nations coming last in the pools were relegated to Group II for 2001.

Pools

Knockout stage

  advanced to the 2001 World Group Play-offs.

Group II
Venue: Estoril T.C., Estoril, Portugal (outdoor clay)
Date: 28 March – 1 April

The twenty-three teams were divided into three pools of six and one pool of five. The top teams from each pool advanced to Group I for 2001.

Pools

See also
Fed Cup structure

References

 Fed Cup Profile, Netherlands
 Fed Cup Profile, Bulgaria
 Fed Cup Profile, Sweden
 Fed Cup Profile, Hungary
 Fed Cup Profile, South Africa
 Fed Cup Profile, Greece
 Fed Cup Profile, Belarus
 Fed Cup Profile, Slovenia
 Fed Cup Profile, Romania
 Fed Cup Profile, Poland
 Fed Cup Profile, Israel
 Fed Cup Profile, Luxembourg
 Fed Cup Profile, Ukraine
 Fed Cup Profile, Great Britain
 Fed Cup Profile, Macedonia
 Fed Cup Profile, Ireland
 Fed Cup Profile, Malta
 Fed Cup Profile, Mauritius
 Fed Cup Profile, Denmark
 Fed Cup Profile, Bosnia and Herzegovina
 Fed Cup Profile, Tunisia
 Fed Cup Profile, Liechtenstein
 Fed Cup Profile, Botswana
 Fed Cup Profile, Yugoslavia
 Fed Cup Profile, Georgia
 Fed Cup Profile, Lithuania
 Fed Cup Profile, Egypt
 Fed Cup Profile, Armenia
 Fed Cup Profile, Estonia
 Fed Cup Profile, Moldova
 Fed Cup Profile, Portugal
 Fed Cup Profile, Algeria
 Fed Cup Profile, Madagascar

External links
 Fed Cup website

 
Europe Africa
Sport in Murcia
Tennis tournaments in Spain
Sport in Estoril
Tennis tournaments in Portugal
Fed
2000 in Portuguese tennis